The Renault Kiger is a subcompact crossover SUV manufactured and marketed by Renault. It was revealed in January 2021 and has been marketed since March 2021. Designed and manufactured in India, it is positioned under the Duster to occupy the sub-4 metre crossover SUV segment in India.

Renault plans to launch an electric version of the Kiger in 2023.

Overview 
Developed under the project code HBC, the design of the Kiger was previewed in its concept "showcar" version on 18 November 2020. The production version was released on 28 January 2021 in New Delhi. Kiger is the work of the French and Indian design divisions. The Kiger is built on the Renault-Nissan CMF-A+ platform shared with the closely related Triber MPV and the Nissan Magnite. The crossover receives a sculpted hood, a semi-floating roof with an integrated gallery that extends to the windshield, as well as two central exhaust outlets.

At launch, Renault claimed the vehicle has the best-in-class cargo capacity with a volume of 405 liters, expandable to 879 liters after folding the rear seats.

The Kiger was introduced in Indonesia in August 2021. It is offered in a single RXZ trim with a 1.0-litre turbocharged engine option.

The Kiger was introduced in Brunei in late July 2022, marking the return of the Renault brand in the Brunei market after 9 years. It is offered in the RXZ variant with a 1.0-litre turbocharged engine option.

Safety 

The Renault Kiger, manufactured and sold in India, was tested by Global NCAP in H1 2022 (similar to Latin NCAP 2013) in its most basic safety specification of double frontal airbags and ISOFIX anchorages, and scored four stars for adult occupant protection and two stars for child occupant protection. The vehicle's passenger compartment became unstable during the frontal crash test, but like the Renault Triber tested earlier, footwell intrusion and rupture was insignificant.

During the test it was found that the Top Tether anchorages in the Kiger purchased for the test could not be used by consumers because they were completely sealed by the fabric lining the boot, and would require cutting of the fabric to be accessed. Hence Global NCAP decided that Renault would not be allowed to use the anchorages in the test and had to install both child seats using an adult seatbelt.

The Kiger for the Indian market is available with double frontal airbags as standard and can be equipped with optional side torso airbags. ESC is not available on the Kiger in India but is offered as an option in South Africa. The Kiger does not offer three-point seatbelts in all seating positions which can cause severe spinal and abdominal injuries to an adult occupant in a crash.

References

External links 

 

Kiger
Cars introduced in 2021
Mini sport utility vehicles
Crossover sport utility vehicles
Front-wheel-drive vehicles
Vehicles with CVT transmission
Global NCAP small family cars